James Merrick Hubble (born 12 August 1942) is a former Australian cricketer who toured South Africa with the Australian team in 1966-67 but did not play Test cricket.

A left-arm opening bowler, Jim Hubble made his first-class debut for Western Australia in 1964-65, taking four wickets in two matches. He played four matches in 1965-66, partnering Graham McKenzie with the new ball and taking 17 wickets at an average of 28.00, and was selected for the tour to South Africa ahead of more experienced pace bowlers such as Alan Connolly and Peter Allan.

In South Africa he took 5 for 74 against Eastern Province in his second match of the tour and finished with 18 wickets in eight first-class matches at 24.44. After struggling with an ankle injury during two matches in 1967-68 he retired.

Hubble gradually recovered fitness and form in Perth club cricket and returned to the state side for the last three matches of the 1972-73 season. In the first match he scored 33 not out in the second innings in an unbroken eighth-wicket partnership of 87 with Graham House to take Western Australia to victory over Victoria. In the second match, against Queensland, he took 3 for 35 and 7 for 49 as well as making 46 not out to help Western Australia to another victory, and in the last match he took five wickets in an innings victory over South Australia that gave Western Australia the Sheffield Shield. In three matches he scored 105 runs at 105.00 and took 17 wickets at 17.41.

He was unable to reproduce that success in subsequent seasons, and played only three matches in 1973-74 and one last match in 1974-75.

References

External links
 

1942 births
Living people
Western Australia cricketers
People educated at Perth Modern School
Australian cricketers
Cricketers from Fremantle